St Mildred's Church or similar variations can refer to numerous churches:

United Kingdom
St Mildred, Bread Street, London
St Mildred, Poultry, London
St Mildred's Church, Lee, London
St Mildred's Church, Canterbury
St Mildred's Church, Whippingham, Isle of Wight
St Mildred's Priory, Minster in Thanet
St Mildred's Church, Preston-next-Wingham, Kent
St Mildred's Church, Tenterden, Kent
St Mildred's Church, Nurstead, Kent
St Mildred's, Ipswich (on the site now occupied by the Town Hall)

Other places
Chapelle Sainte Mildrède, Millam, Nord department, France
Sint Meldredakerk, Izenberge, West Flanders, Belgium
St. Mildred Catholic Church, Swansboro, North Carolina, United States